David Price (born 31 August 1971) is an English former footballer. He played professionally in both England and the USA.

Youth playing career
Price captained both the U19 Merseyside Boys team and Cardinal Heenan Catholic High School who won the Great Britain National Championship in 1990. He had a short spell at Bolton Wanderers but moved to the United States after receiving a full-scholarship to play for the University of Bridgeport. In the college off-season he played for Bridgeport Vasco da Gama who went to the final of the 1992 U.S. Open Cup. He transferred to St. John's Red Storm in 1992 and he won two Big East regular season Championships and two Big East Championship games. He was also captain of the team in 1993. In 1994, he won the U23 National Championship representing New York State.

Professional playing career
Price played over 200 professional games for three teams in the USISL. He was an All-Star in 1995 with the New Jersey Imperials and an A-League All-Star in 1999 with the Long Island Rough Riders. He reached the final four in 1997 with the Riders and ended his playing career with the New York Freedom. He was captain for all three teams.

Coaching career
Price is an A licence coach and has coached at the Youth, College and Professional levels in the United States. As a Head Coach he has taken four teams to a combination of five National Championship finals. In doing so he became the first coach in the history of the Eastern New York Youth Soccer Association to lead a team to the National Championships for three consecutive years. As a result, he was awarded the bigapplesoccer coach of the Year in 2004 and 2005. In 2006, he was named the New York Red Bulls U20 Head Coach and taken them to a National Championship final in the same year. From 2010-2012 he was named the U18 Head Coach and U23 Assistant Coach for the New York Cosmos working under Director of Soccer Eric Cantona. He has been a Director of Coaching for both the New York Freedom and Storm Academy and won a National Championship with both organizations. Price has also worked with Leeds United as Chief Scout for the United States guiding them towards players such as Robbie Rodgers and Michael Grella. He currently works for the United States Soccer Federation and owns the Storm Soccer Academy.

See also
1992 U.S. Open Cup

References

External links
 http://www.liverpoolecho.co.uk/everton-fc/everton-fc-news/2003/08/14/david-finds-freedom-in-big-apple-100252-13293126/
 https://web.archive.org/web/20110708222219/http://www.dallassoccernews.com/sections/college2.php?article_id=835
 https://web.archive.org/web/20150923185247/http://www.bigapplesoccer.com/youth/youth2.php?article_id=5056
 https://web.archive.org/web/20160304035712/http://www.bigapplesoccer.com/youth/youth2.php?article_id=3003 
 https://web.archive.org/web/20131111151834/http://www.bigapplesoccer.com/youth/youth2.php?article_id=6307

1971 births
Living people
Footballers from Liverpool
Association football midfielders
English footballers
Bolton Wanderers F.C. players
Long Island Rough Riders players
New York Freedom players
English expatriate footballers
Expatriate soccer players in the United States
English football managers
Expatriate soccer managers in the United States
English expatriate sportspeople in the United States